Brachyiulus jawlowskii is a species of millipede in the genus Brachyiulus. It is endemic to Turkey.

References

Animals described in 1928
Julida
Millipedes of Asia